A partial lunar eclipse will take place on June 26, 2048. The Moon will be strikingly shadowed in this deep partial eclipse lasting 2 hours and 39 minutes, with 63.88% of the Moon in darkness at maximum.

Visibility

Related lunar eclipses

Lunar year series

Half-Saros cycle
A lunar eclipse will be preceded and followed by solar eclipses by 9 years and 5.5 days (a half saros). This lunar eclipse is related to two annular solar eclipses of Solar Saros 147.

See also
List of lunar eclipses and List of 21st-century lunar eclipses

Notes

External links

2048-06
2048-06
2048 in science